The 2023 UC Santa Barbara Gauchos men's volleyball team represents University of California, Santa Barbara in the 2023 NCAA Division I & II men's volleyball season. The Gauchos, led by fifteenth year head coach Rick McLaughlin, playtheir home games between Robertson Gymnasium. The Gauchos compete as members of the Big West Conference and were picked the finish fourth in the Big West preseason poll.

Preseason

Coaches poll 
The preseason poll was released on December 21, 2022. UC Santa Barbara was picked to finish fourth in the Big West Conference standings.

Roster

Schedule
TV/Internet Streaming/Radio information:
ESPN+ will carry most home and all conference road games. All other road broadcasts will be carried by the schools respective streaming partner. 

 *-Indicates conference match.
 Times listed are Pacific Time Zone.

Announcers for televised games

USC: Max Kelton & Katie Spieler
UCLA: Max Kelton & Katie Spieler 
Stanford: Troy Clardy 
Stanford: Ted Enberg
USC: Max Kelton & Cameron Greene  
UCLA: 
Pepperdine: 
Pepperdine: 
BYU: 
BYU: 
Vanguard: 
UC San Diego: 
Long Beach State: 
Long Beach State: 
Harvard: 
UC Irvine: 
UC Irvine: 
Hawai'i: 
Hawai'i: 
UC San Diego: 
CSUN: 
CSUN: 
Big West Tournament:

Rankings 

^The Media did not release a Pre-season poll.

References

2023 in sports in California
2023 NCAA Division I & II men's volleyball season
2023 team
UC Santa Barbara